Toms Lake is a  lake that is located at the tri-county corner of Delta County, Michigan,  Alger and Schoolcraft countries in the Hiawatha National Forest.  The forest service offers a rustic cabin for rent.  Other nearby lakes include Hugaboom Lake, Blue Lake,  Ironjaw Lake, Ostrande Lake, Corner-Straits Chain and Round Lake.

See also
List of lakes in Michigan

References 

Lakes of Schoolcraft County, Michigan
Lakes of Alger County, Michigan
Lakes of Delta County, Michigan
Lakes of Michigan